Stenoglene preussi is a moth in the family Eupterotidae. It was described by Per Olof Christopher Aurivillius in 1893. It is found in Cameroon, the Central African Republic, the Democratic Republic of the Congo (Orientale, North Kivu) and Kenya.

References

Moths described in 1893
Janinae